Jean-Marc Audemar (born 15 August 1971 in France) is a French retired footballer who is last known to have played for US Stade Tamponnaise of the Reunion Premier League in 2007.

Singapore 

Following Benoît Salviat and Nicodeme Boucher to Singapore's Tanjong Pagar United in early 2004, Audemar finished the season among the best defenders in the league and was nominated for the Singapore Pools People's Choice Award, having been forced to leave Tanjong Pagar United due to their overleveragedness. He did not exclude a return to Reunion though, and, in 2006, sealed a move to US Possession.

References

External links 
 at Footballdatabase.eu

1971 births
Living people
French expatriate footballers
Singapore Premier League players
French expatriate sportspeople in Singapore
Association football defenders
Expatriate footballers in Singapore
French footballers
Tanjong Pagar United FC players
Expatriate footballers in Réunion
SS Saint-Louisienne players
FC Vaulx-en-Velin players